The Labour Party is a centre-left social democratic political party in Hong Kong established in 2011. 

The party was founded in 2011 by three veteran pro-democracy legislators to consolidate centre-left, pro-labour, pro-democracy voices in the legislature. Led by Lee Cheuk-yan, the long-time general secretary of the Hong Kong Confederation of Trade Unions (HKCTU), the party won four seats in the 2012 Legislative Council election, with about six per cent of the popular vote, making it the third largest political party in the pro-democracy camp and sixth largest in the legislature.

It suffered a big loss in the 2016 election with veterans Lee Cheuk-yan and Cyd Ho losing their seats, leaving the party only one representative in the legislature, Fernando Cheung in New Territories East. Cheung resigned in November 2020 together with 14 legislators of the pro-democratic camp, in protest over the disqualification of four other members of that camp by the Hong Kong government.

Beliefs
The Labour Party positions itself as a social democratic party with the principles of "Democracy, Justice, Sustainability and Solidarity". It also demands universal suffrage, legislation of competition law and maximum weekly working hours, rehabilitate the Tiananmen protests of 1989 and against the legislation of Article 23.

The Labour Party was the first major party to adopt a policy of supporting laws to prohibit discrimination against the LGBT community.

History
The idea of establishing a pro-labour party first emerged in the 1990s, when four pro-labour pro-democracy legislators, Lau Chin-shek and Lee Cheuk-yan from the Hong Kong Confederation of Trade Unions (CTU), Leung Yiu-chung from the Neighbourhood and Worker's Service Centre (NWSC) and Tsang Kin-shing from the Democratic Party set up a joint office in preparation of the labour party, but the idea did not realise at last.

In early 2011, Lee Cheuk-yan expressed interest in forming a new labour party, and discussed the details with legislators Leung Yiu-chung, Cheung Kwok-che from the Hong Kong Social Workers' General Union (SWGU), Cyd Ho from the Civic Act-up and Fernando Cheung, an ex-Civic Party politician. Cheung was the first to advocate the formation of a labour party for the labour rights, new immigrants, ethnic minorities and environmental issues in the coming 2012 Legislative Council election.

The Labour Party was officially founded on 18 December 2011. The New World First Bus Company Staff Union, the KMB Staff Union and the Hong Kong Buildings Management And Security Workers General Union under the CTU and Civic Act-up joined the party as affiliated groups. The NWSC vetoed the motion of joining the Labour Party. A 20-strong Executive Committee was elected with CTU General Secretary Lee Cheuk-yan was elected unopposed by 131 founding members, while Cyd Ho, Fernando Cheung and Yeung Ho-yan became the Vice-Chairmen, Cheung Kwok-che the Senate chairman, and Tam Chun-yin the General Secretary.

The party filled three lists in the geographical constituency election in the 2012 Legislative Council elections, the incumbent Lee Cheuk-yan and Cyd Ho ran in New Territories West and Hong Kong Island and former legislator Fernando Cheung ran in New Territories East. The party secured four seats with all the lists elected and Cheung Kwok-che returned through the Social Welfare functional constituency. It became the third largest pro-democracy party in the legislature, behind the Democratic Party and the Civic Party.

The party gained its first seat at the district level in the San Fu by-election in 2015. In the 2015 District Council election, the party filled in 12 candidates, of which three were elected. On 13 December 2015, the Labour chairman Lee Cheuk-yan stepped down and three candidates, Kwok Wing-kin, Cheng Sze-lut and Suzanne Wu ran for the chairmanship. Suzanne Wu of the Association for the Advancement of Feminism won the election in the end and became the new chairwoman.

The Labour suffered a major defeat in the 2016 Legislative Council election by losing two veteran legislators Lee Cheuk-yan and Cyd Ho. With the retiring Social Welfare legislator Cheung Kwok-che, the party dropped their seats in the legislature from four to only one. Chairwoman Suzanne Wu, who was running in Kowloon East and pulled out from the race in the last days resigned for the election results.

In August 2017, chairwoman Suzanne Wu resigned and quit the party over an internal rift with veteran member Cyd Ho, who also resigned from all party offices as a result. Vice-chairman Kwok Wing-kin was elected the new chairman in an intra-party election in November 2017.

Performance in elections

Legislative Council elections

District Council elections

Leadership

Chairmen
 Lee Cheuk-yan, 2011–2015
 Suzanne Wu, 2015–2017
 Chiu Shi-shun, acting 2017
 Kwok Wing-kin, 2017–present

Vice Chairmen (External Affairs)
 Cheng Sze-lut, 2011–2015
 Lee Cheuk-yan, 2015–present

Vice Chairmen (Party Affairs)
 Tam Chun-yin, 2011–2015
 Chiu Shi-shun, 2015–2017
 Tam Leung-ying, 2017–present

Vice Chairmen (Policy)
 Fernando Cheung, 2011–2015
 Kwok Wing-kin, 2015–2017
 Mak Tak-ching, 2017–present

General Secretaries
 Kwok Wing-kin, 2011–2015
 Tam Chun-yin, 2015–2017
 Lee Man-fung, 2017–present

See also
 League of Social Democrats

References

External links
Labour Party official website

2011 establishments in Hong Kong
Labour parties in China
Liberal parties in Hong Kong
Member organisations of the Civil Human Rights Front
Political parties established in 2011
Political parties in Hong Kong
Pro-democracy camp (Hong Kong)
Social democratic parties in Hong Kong